Grípisspá (Grípir's prophecy) or Sigurðarkviða Fáfnisbana I ("First Lay of Sigurd Fáfnir's Slayer") is an Eddic poem, found in the Codex Regius manuscript where it follows Frá dauða Sinfjötla and precedes Reginsmál.

The poem consists of a conversation between Sigurd and his uncle, Grípir, who predicts his future at some length, giving an overview of his life. The poem is well preserved and coherent. It is thought to be among the youngest poems of the Codex Regius, dating to the 12th or 13th century. The metre is fornyrðislag.

External links
Gripisspo Translation and commentary by Henry A. Bellows
Gripisspa Translation by Benjamin Thorpe
Grípisspá Translation by Lee M. Hollander
Sigurðarkviða Fáfnisbana hin fyrsta Sophus Bugge's edition of the manuscript text
Grípisspá Guðni Jónsson's edition of the text with normalized spelling

12th-century poems
13th-century poems
Eddic poetry
Nibelung tradition
Sources of Norse mythology